Richard Oblitey  Commey (born 10 March 1987) is a Ghanaian professional boxer who held the IBF lightweight title in 2019. He previously held multiple regional lightweight titles including; the Ghanaian title in 2011; the ABU title in 2013; and the Commonwealth title from 2014 to 2015.

Professional career
On 9 September 2016, Commey fought for a world title for the first time in his career, against undefeated Robert Easter Jr. Both fighters had a strong start in the first four rounds. Commey managed to drop Easter Jr. in the eighth round, but it wouldn't be enough for the judges, two of them scoring the fight 115–112 and 114–113 in favor of Easter Jr., while the third judge scored the fight 114–113 for Commey, handing Easter Jr. the split-decision win.

After losing to Robert Easter Jr. for the vacant IBF lightweight title in 2016, Commey defeated Isa Chaniev in 2019 to capture the IBF title in his second attempt.

In his next fight, Commey made his first title defence, against former champion Ray Beltrán. The title however, was on the line for Beltran, since he failed to make the required weight limit for the fight. Commey dropped Beltrán four times during the fight, the last knockdown being the decisive one, since it prompted referee Eddie Hernandez Sr to stop the fight.

Next up, Commey squared off against undefeated 22-year old prospect Teófimo López on 14 December 2019, who was ranked #1 lightweight by the IBF. During the middle of the second round, both fighters tried to connect on a right hand, but López was the one who got to his target first, catching Commey with a vicious right hand which sent him down on the floor. Commey managed to beat the count, however, López immediately went in attack mode, forcing the referee to stop the fight.

On 13 February 2021, Commey rebounded from his defeat against López with a sixth-round knockout victory against Jackson Marinez.

On 11 December 2021, Commey faced recently deposed former champion Vasiliy Lomachenko from Ukraine in an almost one-sided fight. Lomachenko dominated the fight from round one to round twelve. In round 7 Commey was knocked down and visibly shaken, causing Lomachenko to tell Commey's corner to stop the fight because of the obvious damages done to the Ghanaian fighter. After some ringside verification at the start of round 8, Commey continued, and Lomachenko won nearly all the remaining rounds. Lomachenko defeated Commey in a unanimous decision.

Professional boxing record

References

External links

Image - Richard Commey
Richard Commey - Profile, News Archive & Current Rankings at Box.Live

Lightweight boxers
Living people
Ghanaian male boxers
1987 births
African Boxing Union champions
International Boxing Federation champions
World lightweight boxing champions